Francisco Rebollo (born August 5, 1938 San Juan, Puerto Rico) is a former Associate Justice of the Supreme Court of Puerto Rico, served in that position from 1982 to 2008. Appointed by Governor Carlos Romero Barceló, Rebollo served under Chief Justices Víctor Pons, José Andreu García, and Federico Hernández Denton, as well as under Chief Justice Miriam Naveira, in addition to having served as acting Chief Justice himself.

Prior to joining the Supreme Court Rebollo served as a Superior Court judge and as an attorney in private practice.

He resigned on July 31, 2008, prior to  reaching the mandatory retirement age of 70 in August 2008.  Speculation suggested that the resultant vacancy would probably remain unfilled until the swearing  in of a new governor on January 2, 2009.  Two prior vacancies, occasioned by the mandatory retirement of Associate Justice Baltasar Corrada del Rio in April, 2005, and by the death of Associate Justice Jaime Fuster in December, 2007, had remained unfilled due to an impasse between former pro-commonwealth Governor Aníbal Acevedo Vilá and former pro-statehood Senate President Kenneth McClintock, who announced that in addition to all other qualifications, the two vacancies created by both pro-statehood justices needed to be filled by nominees with similar ideological leanings.  Governor Luis Fortuño had the option of filling the vacancies during his term in office (2009–2013).

After his retirement, Rebollo returned to private practice, joining the law firm of Fiddler, Gonzalez & Rodriguez in 2009.

External links

1938 births
Living people
Puerto Rican judges